Vasanth TV is a Tamil entertainment satellite channel which is owned by MP Vijay Vasanth of Vasanth & Co Group.

The company has tied up with Tata Communications for providing the uplinking facilities.

List of shows
Aalaya Darisanam
Kitchen Killadigal
Vetri Padi Kattu
Fun O Fun
Thenaruvi
Mann Pesum Sarithram
Gala Gala Galatta

List of films
Pizhai (2020)
Day Knight (2020)
Dha Dha 87 (2019)
Kaathadi (2018)
Koottali (2018)
Andhra Mess (2018)
Genius (2018)
Pandigai (2017)
Attu (2017)
Bongu (2017)
Chennaiyil Oru Naal 2 (2017)
Mupparimanam (2017)
Aarambame Attagaasam (2017)
Maaveeran Kittu (2017)
Kadhal Kasakkuthaiyya (2017)
Nenjil Thunivirundhal (2017)
Adhagappattathu Magajanangalay (2017)
Mudhal Kadhal Mazhai (2010)
Sanikizhamai Saayangalam 5 Mani (2010)
Ochayee (2010)
Lathika (2010)

See also
 Vasanth & Co

References

External links
 Official website
 Vasanth TV on YouTube

Television stations in Chennai
Tamil-language television channels
Television channels and stations established in 2008
Companies based in Chennai
2008 establishments in Tamil Nadu